Lawrani (Aymara lawra a kind of fish, -ni a suffix, "the one with the lawra fish", also spelled Laurani) is a  mountain in the Bolivian Andes. It is located in the La Paz Department, Loayza Province, Luribay Municipality, northeast of Luribay.

References 

Mountains of La Paz Department (Bolivia)